John Rice Eden (February 1, 1826 – June 9, 1909) was a U.S. Representative from Illinois.

Born in Bath County, Kentucky, Eden moved with his parents to Indiana.
He attended public schools, and later studied law.
He was admitted to the bar in 1853 at Shelbyville, Ill and commenced practice in Sullivan, Illinois.
He served as prosecuting attorney for the seventeenth judicial district of Illinois 1856-1860.

Eden was elected as a Democrat to the Thirty-eighth Congress (March 4, 1863 – March 3, 1865).
He was an unsuccessful candidate for reelection in 1864 to the Thirty-ninth Congress.
He was an unsuccessful Democratic nominee for Governor of Illinois in 1868.

Eden was elected to the Forty-third, Forty-fourth, and Forty-fifth Congresses (March 4, 1873 – March 3, 1879).
He served as chairman of the Committee on War Claims (Forty-fourth and Forty-fifth Congresses).
He was an unsuccessful candidate for renomination in 1878.
He resumed the practice of law in Sullivan, Illinois.

Eden was elected to the Forty-ninth Congress (March 4, 1885 – March 3, 1887).
He was an unsuccessful candidate for renomination in 1886.
He again engaged in the practice of law.
He died in Sullivan, Illinois, June 9, 1909.
He was interred in Greenhill Cemetery.

References

1826 births
1909 deaths
Illinois lawyers
People of Illinois in the American Civil War
Democratic Party members of the United States House of Representatives from Illinois
19th-century American politicians
People from Bath County, Kentucky
People from Sullivan, Illinois